The 1972 Missouri lieutenant gubernatorial election was held on November 7, 1972. Republican nominee Bill Phelps narrowly defeated Democratic nominee Jack J. Schramm with 50.14% of the vote.

Primary elections
Primary elections were held on August 8, 1972.

Democratic primary

Candidates
Jack J. Schramm, State Representative
James E. Godfrey, Speaker of the Missouri House of Representatives
James P. Aylward Jr.
John Owens Bond
John C. McAllister
Wallace P. Wright
Leonard L. Bade

Results

Republican primary

Candidates
Bill Phelps, State Representative
Joseph L. Badaracco, President of the St. Louis Board of Aldermen
Marvin L. Kennon, State Representative
William B. "Bill" Ewald, former State Representative
Gregory Hansman

Results

General election

Candidates
Major party candidates
Bill Phelps, Republican
Jack J. Schramm, Democratic

Other candidates
Edward Verburg, Nonpartisan

Results

References

1972
Gubernatorial
Missouri